East Retford West is an electoral ward in the district of Bassetlaw. The ward elects two councillors to Bassetlaw District Council using the first past the post electoral system, with each councillor serving a four-year term in office. The number of registered voters in the ward is 3,740 as of 2019.

It consists of the northern part of the village of Ordsall in Retford, Thrumpton and the western part of Retford town centre.

The ward was created in 2002 following a review of electoral boundaries in Bassetlaw by the Boundary Committee for England.

Councillors

The ward elects 2 councillors every four years. Prior to 2015, Bassetlaw District Council was elected by thirds with elections taking place every year except the year in which elections to Nottinghamshire County Council took place.

Elections

2019

2018 by-election
A by-election was held on 15 November 2018 following the disqualification of Alan Chambers (Labour) due to non-attendance at council meetings.

2015

2014

2012

2010

2008

2006

2004

2002

References

Wards of Nottinghamshire